Glutaredoxin-1 is a protein that in humans is encoded by the GLRX gene.

Interactions
GLRX has been shown to interact with Wilson disease protein and ATP7A.

References

Further reading